Paul Newman is an American accountant, currently the Clark W. Thompson Jr. Chair in Accounting at University of Texas at Austin.

References

Year of birth missing (living people)
Living people
American accountants
University of Texas at Austin faculty